The XII Constitutional Government of São Tomé and Príncipe (Portuguese: XII Governo Constitucional de São Tomé e Príncipe) was a Government of São Tomé and Príncipe. It was established in February 2008 and was disestablished in May 2008.

References

2008 establishments in São Tomé and Príncipe
Cabinets established in 2008
Government of São Tomé and Príncipe
Cabinets disestablished in 2008